Bien-Aimé may refer to:

Ships
 French ship Bien-Aimé, several ships of the French Navy
 Bien-Aimé class ship of the line, see French ship Victoire (1773)

People with the surname
 Gabriel Bien-Aimé (died 2010), former Minister of National Education of Haiti
 Paul Antoine Bien-Aimé, former Minister of Interior and Territorial Collectivities of Haiti
 Sonia Bien-Aime (born 1971), president of the Turks and Caicos Islands Football Association
 Taina Bien-Aimé, Swiss activist and lawyer

See also
 Bienaimé (disambiguation)
 French frigate Dur (1671), a 24-gun frigate later renamed Bien Aimée; see List of French sail frigates
 French frigate Dur (1673), a 28-gun frigate later renamed Bien Aimée; see List of French sail frigates